Zuzanna Szwed (19 born July 1977) is a Polish former competitive figure skater. She is the 1994 Karl Schäfer Memorial champion, 1995 Finlandia Trophy silver medalist, and a five-time Polish national champion. She competed at the 1992 Winter Olympics in Albertville.

Personal life 
Zuzanna Szwed was born on 19 July 1977 in Warsaw, Poland. She married American pair skater Aaron Parchem in Chicago in 2004. They have a daughter, Sofie (born  2011).

Career 
Szwed began skating in 1983 and was coached by Lucja Rylska early in her career. Making her first ISU Championship appearance, she placed 15th at the 1991 Junior Worlds in Budapest, Hungary.

Szwed competed at the 1992 Winter Olympics in Albertville, France. She qualified for the final segment by placing 23rd in the short program and went on to finish 19th overall. She was the first skater to represent Poland in ladies' single skating at the Olympics.

In the 1993–94 season, Szwed finished eighth at the World Junior Championships in Colorado Springs, Colorado and second at the Polish Championships, both times finishing behind Anna Rechnio, who was selected to compete at the 1994 Winter Olympics in Lillehammer.

In the 1994–95 season, Szwed won gold at the 1994 Karl Schäfer Memorial ahead of Krisztina Czakó and Maria Butyrskaya. Ranked 15th in the short and second in the free, she finished seventh overall at the 1995 World Junior Championships in Budapest.

In the 1997–98 season, Szwed took bronze at the Polish Championships behind Rechnio and Sabina Wojtala. She was coached by Craig Maurizi in Detroit.

In total, Szwed reached the free skate at thirteen ISU Championships – three Worlds, seven Europeans, and three Junior Worlds. She finished in the top ten at four Europeans and two Junior Worlds and in the top fourteen at two Worlds. She works as a coach and choreographer at the Detroit Skating Club in Bloomfield Hills, Michigan.

Programs

Results
GP: Champions Series (Grand Prix)

References

Figure skaters at the 1992 Winter Olympics
Olympic figure skaters of Poland
Polish female single skaters
1977 births
Living people
Figure skaters from Warsaw
Polish emigrants to the United States